Richard Guy Shrider (February 7, 1923 – January 21, 2014) was an American professional basketball player and college coach. Shrider was selected in the 1948 BAA Draft by the New York Knicks after a collegiate career at Ohio. He played for the Knicks for four total games in 1948 before then playing in the National Basketball League for the Detroit Vagabond Kings.

Coaching career
Shrider then became a high school boys' basketball coach at Gallipolis High School until 1955, at which point he took over the boys' basketball team at Fairborn High School. In 1957, Miami University of Ohio named him as their new head coach. In 1957–58, his first season, Shrider's Redskins (now RedHawks) went undefeated against Mid-American Conference (MAC) opponents. They became the first MAC team to ever win an NCAA Tournament game that year as well. During Shrider's nine seasons as Miami's head coach he led them to four MAC championships and two NCAA Tournament appearances (1958, 1966). He compiled an overall record of 126–96, and in 1996 he was named an honoree of the school's "Cradle of Coaches" award.

After retiring from coaching in 1966, Shrider stayed as the school's athletic director until 1988.

BAA career statistics

Regular season

Head coaching record

College

References

External links

1923 births
2014 deaths
American men's basketball coaches
American men's basketball players
Basketball coaches from Ohio
Basketball players from Ohio
College men's basketball head coaches in the United States
Detroit Vagabond Kings players
Guards (basketball)
High school basketball coaches in the United States
Miami RedHawks athletic directors
Miami RedHawks men's basketball coaches
New York Knicks draft picks
New York Knicks players
Ohio Bobcats men's basketball players
People from Perry County, Ohio